Coleophora caroxyli is a moth of the family Coleophoridae. It is found in Uzbekistan.

The larvae live in galls on Caroxylon species constructed by flies of the family Cecidomyiidae. They are yellow with a chocolate-brown head and about 4 mm in length. They can be found from May to October. There are at least two generations per year.

References

caroxyli
Moths described in 1970
Moths of Asia